Tiffany Steuber (born July 17, 1977, in Grande Prairie, Alberta as Tiffany McKeeman) is a Canadian curler from Parkland County.

Steuber's first World Curling Tour event came in 2008 at the Red Deer Curling Classic. Steuber skipped her own team that season before moving to play third for Karallee Swabb in 2009. She would only play in one event that season before forming her own team again in 2010.

Steuber won her first Tour event at the 2012 Spruce Grove Cashspiel over Holly Whyte. After skipping for three seasons, Steuber dissolved her team and joined with Kaufman in 2013. As a member of the Kaufman rink, Steuber won the 2013 Avonair Cash Spiel.

References

External links
 

1977 births
Canadian women curlers
Curlers from Alberta
Living people
People from Grande Prairie
People from Parkland County